Isakovskaya is a rural locality (a village) in Dvinskoye Rural Settlement of Verkhnetoyemsky District, Arkhangelsk Oblast, Russia. The population was 53 as of 2010.

Geography 
It is located on the Sodonga River.

References 

Rural localities in Verkhnetoyemsky District